Nick Grinde (January 12, 1893 – June 19, 1979) was an American film director and screenwriter. He directed 57 films between 1928 and 1945.

Biography
Born Harry A. Grinde in Madison, Wisconsin but nicknamed "Nick," Grinde graduated from the University of Wisconsin. He later moved to New York and worked in Vaudeville. Grinde became a Hollywood film writer and director in the late 1920s, and was often assigned to familiarize Broadway stage directors with the techniques of film making. As a director, he is considered one of American cinema's early B film specialists. Notable films include The Man they Could Not Hang with Boris Karloff, and Ronald Reagan's first motion picture: Love is on the Air (1937). As a screenwriter, he is credited as a co-writer of Laurel and Hardy's Babes in Toyland (1934).

Throughout his career, Grinde was a popular writer of short stories, articles and columns usually about show business and film making in early Hollywood. Prime examples include "Pictures for Peanuts" (Saturday Evening Post, December 29, 1945), a humorous B picture "how-to," and "Where's Vaudeville At?" (Saturday Evening Post, January 11, 1930).

Grinde died in Los Angeles, California in 1979 at the age of 86. In the early 1940s, he was engaged to actress Marie Wilson. Later, he married Korean-American actress Hazel Shon. The Academy of Motion Picture Arts and Sciences houses the Nick Grinde Papers in its Special Collections.

Selected filmography

 The Divorcee (1930 - writer)
 Good News (1930)
 This Modern Age (1931)
 Vanity Street (1932)
 Menu (1933)
 Babes in Toyland (1934 - writer)
 How to Sleep (1935)
 Ladies Crave Excitement (1935)
 Lucky Fugitives (1936)
 Love Is on the Air (1937)
 Exiled to Shanghai (1937)
 Mis dos amores  (1938)
 Delinquent Parents (1938)
 Million Dollar Legs (1939)
 Scandal Sheet (1939)
 The Man They Could Not Hang (1939)
 A Woman Is the Judge (1939)
 The Man with Nine Lives (1940)
 Before I Hang (1940)
 Convicted Woman (1940)
 Girls of the Road (1940)
 Hitler - Dead or Alive (1942)
 The Girl from Alaska (1942)

References

External links

1893 births
1979 deaths
American male screenwriters
Film directors from Wisconsin
Horror film directors
Science fiction film directors
Screenwriters from Wisconsin
Writers from Madison, Wisconsin
20th-century American male writers
20th-century American screenwriters